The year 2007 contained several significant events in spaceflight, including a Chinese ASAT test, the launches of the US Phoenix and Dawn missions to study Mars and Asteroid belt respectively, Japan's Kaguya Lunar orbiter, and the first Chinese Lunar probe, Chang'e 1.

The internationally accepted definition of a spaceflight is any flight which crosses the Kármán line, 100 kilometres above sea level. The first recorded spaceflight launch of the year occurred on 10 January, when a PSLV, launched from the Satish Dhawan Space Centre, placed four spacecraft into low Earth orbit. One of these spacecraft was SRE-1, which returned to Earth twelve days later, in the first Indian attempt to recover a satellite after re-entry.

Several carrier rockets made their maiden flights in 2007; the PSLV-CA, Long March 3B/E, Shavit-2, Zenit-2M, Proton-M Enhanced. These were all modernised or upgraded versions of existing systems. The RS-24 missile also conducted its first launch, and the Atlas V made its first flight in the 421 configuration. The first Colombian and Mauritian satellites, Libertad 1 and Rascom-QAF 1 respectively, were launched in 2007, although a helium leak reduced Rascom's operational lifetime by thirteen years.

Space exploration

Several spacecraft were launched to explore the Moon. Japan's Kaguya orbiter, along with the smaller Okina and Ouna relay spacecraft, was launched on 14 September. The spacecraft entered Selenocentric orbit on 3 October. China launched its first Lunar probe, Chang'e 1, on 24 October, with the spacecraft entering Selenocentric orbit on 5 November. In 2009, two satellites launched into highly elliptical Earth orbits in 2007 as part of the THEMIS mission were also sent to the Moon. They are expected to arrive in October 2010.

In August, the NASA Phoenix spacecraft was launched towards Mars, followed by the Dawn mission to the Asteroid belt in September. Cassini continued to make flybys of the moons of Saturn, mostly focussing on Titan. In November, Rosetta flew past Earth, where it was mistaken for an asteroid, and given the provisional designation 2007 VN84.

Crewed spaceflight 
Five crewed flights were launched in 2007, two by Russia and three by the United States. Russia flew two Soyuz missions to the International Space Station for crew rotation. Soyuz TMA-10, launched on 7 April, carried the Expedition 15 crew to the Station. Space tourist Charles Simonyi was also launched on this flight, and landed aboard Soyuz TMA-9 a few days later. When TMA-10 returned to Earth in October, it made the first of two consecutive ballistic re-entries of Soyuz spacecraft, due to problems with separation bolts. Soyuz TMA-11, launched on 10 October, carried the Expedition 16 crew, and the first Malaysian in space, Sheikh Muszaphar Shukor, who was selected for flight under the Angkasawan programme. He landed aboard Soyuz TMA-10. When TMA-11 landed in 2008, it also made a ballistic descent.

2007 also saw the continued assembly of the International Space Station, by US Space Shuttle flights. On 8 June  made the first Shuttle launch of the year, STS-117, with seven astronauts, and the S3/4 truss segment of the ISS. It was the first Shuttle to launch from Complex 39A at the Kennedy Space Center since STS-107 in 2003. Launch had previously been delayed from February due to Hail damage to the External Tank, which required a rollback to repair in the Vehicle Assembly Building. In August,  launched on its first mission since 2002, STS-118. This carried the S5 truss segment, and marked the final flight of the Spacehab module, which was used to carry supplies. NASA's first Educator Astronaut, Barbara Morgan flew aboard STS-118. Morgan had previously been a backup for Christa McAuliffe, who was killed in the Challenger accident in 1986. STS-120, launched on 23 October using , carried the Harmony node, the first pressurised ISS component to be launched since Pirs in September 2001. Attempts to launch Atlantis in December on STS-122 were scrubbed, and the launch was delayed to 2008 after ECO sensors in the External Tank failed.

Launch failures
Three orbital launch attempts in 2007, involving a Zenit, a Falcon 1, and a Proton failed, and two others, an Atlas V and a GSLV, resulted in partial failures. On 30 January, a Sea Launch Zenit-3SL exploded on the Ocean Odyssey launch platform, seconds after ignition. The failure destroyed the NSS-8 satellite, and caused considerable damage to the Odyssey platform. It was later determined that the failure had been caused by debris in the turbopump. As a result of downtime to conduct repairs, and bad sea conditions at the end of the year, Sea Launch did not conduct another launch until 2008.

On 21 March, SpaceX launched the second Falcon 1. Due to the failure of the maiden flight, the launch was conducted as a demonstration flight without a functional payload. The launch failed to reach orbit due to a chain of events, starting with an error in setting the fuel mix ratio, which resulted in first stage underperformance, and the rocket being too low at the time of first stage separation. Additional atmospheric drag at this altitude caused recontact between the stages, setting up a fuel slosh in the second stage. This resulted in the premature cutoff of the second stage, and the rocket failed to reach orbit. This was the last launch of the Falcon 1 with the ablatively cooled Merlin-1A engine, which was replaced with the regeneratively cooled Merlin-1C for subsequent flights, starting in August 2008. As several test objectives were completed, SpaceX claimed that the launch was a success overall, and declared the Falcon 1 operational.

The Atlas family ended a run of eighty consecutive successful launches over fourteen years, after a partial failure of an Atlas V launched on 15 June. A faulty valve caused a fuel leak in the Centaur upper stage, resulting in a premature cutoff at the end of its second burn. This resulted in the USA-194 satellites being delivered into a lower orbit than planned. The spacecraft were able to correct the orbit using their manoeuvring engines.

The fifth GSLV was launched on 2 September, with the INSAT-4CR satellite. This was the first GSLV launch since the failure in July 2006. The rocket underperformed, and placed the satellite into an orbit with a lower apogee and greater inclination than planned. This required the spacecraft to use fuel reserved for stationkeeping to raise itself to the correct orbit, at the expense of its operational lifetime.

On 5 September, a Proton-M with a Briz-M upper stage failed to place the JCSAT-11 into orbit, after the second stage of the carrier rocket failed to separate from the first. It was later established that damaged cabling had been the cause of the malfunction.

Summary of launches

In total, sixty eight orbital launches were made in 2007, with sixty five reaching orbit, and three outright failures. This was an increase of two orbital launch attempts on 2006, with one more launch reaching orbit. The final launch of the year was conducted on 25 December, by a Proton-M with three GLONASS navigation satellites for the Russian government.

Suborbital spaceflight in 2007 saw a number of sounding rocket and missile launches. On 11 January, the Chinese People's Liberation Army used a Dong-Feng 21 derived anti-satellite weapon to destroy Feng Yun 1C, a retired weather satellite. Russia also began testing the RS-24 Yars missile

China conducted ten orbital launches in 2007, using the Long March family of rockets, whilst Europe conducted five using the Ariane 5. India made three orbital launch attempts, using PSLV-C, PSLV-CA and GSLV rockets, with the GSLV launch resulting in a partial failure. Israel conducted a single successful launch using the first Shavit-2 rocket. Japan successfully launched two H-IIA rockets. Russia and the former Soviet Union conducted twenty six launches, including one failure, but not including the international Sea Launch programme, whose single launch attempt failed. Nineteen launches were conducted by the United States, which had originally announced plans to launch many more, however technical issues with the Atlas V, Delta IV and Falcon 1, caused a number of delays. Two of six planned Space Shuttle launches were also delayed to 2008, STS-123 due to knock-on delays from STS-117, and STS-122 due to problems with engine cutoff sensors.

Launches

|colspan=8 style="background:white;"|

January
|-

|colspan=8 style="background:white;"|

February
|-

|colspan=8 style="background:white;"|

March
|-

|colspan=8 style="background:white;"|

April
|-

|colspan=8 style="background:white;"|

May
|-

|colspan=8 style="background:white;"|

June
|-

|colspan=8 style="background:white;"|

July
|-

|colspan=8 style="background:white;"|

August
|-

|colspan=8 style="background:white;"|

September
|-

|colspan=8 style="background:white;"|

October
|-

|colspan=8 style="background:white;"|

November
|-

|colspan=8 style="background:white;"|

December
|-

|}

Deep Space Rendezvous 

Distant, non-targeted flybys of Dione, Enceladus, Mimas, Tethys and Titan by Cassini occurred throughout the year.

EVAs

Orbital launch statistics

By country

By rocket

By family

By type

By configuration

By launch site

By orbit

References

Footnotes

 
Spaceflight by year